Wigram is a suburb in the southwest of Christchurch, New Zealand. The suburb lies close to the industrial estates of Sockburn and the satellite retail and residential zone of Hornby, and has undergone significant growth in recent years due to housing developments. It is seven kilometres to the west of the city centre.

Etymology
The suburb is named after Sir Henry Wigram, mayor of Christchurch from 1902 to 1903, who established a flying school there in 1916. Wigram kept the aviation school going until March 1923, when the government decided to take over the company and run the airbase under a military umbrella. The final purchase price was £31,012.

In June 1923 the base was officially handed over and renamed Wigram Aerodrome. Wigram continued to support the base, gifting a further  of land in 1932.

History
The first trans-Tasman flight touched down in Wigram on 11 September 1928 at 9.22 a.m. Piloted by Australian's Charles Kingsford Smith and Charles Ulm they departed Richmond, west of Sydney flying the Southern Cross. The welcome was tremendous. A crowd of 30,000 people, one quarter of the total population of Christchurch at that time, turned out to see this historic event. A plaque on the landing site at Wigram Skies commemorates the event. The Heritage Reserve, located on Bennington Way in the George West neighbourhood, marks the actual location of the touchdown by the Southern Cross. The commemorative plaque placed nearby was originally used in 1978 to mark the 50th Anniversary of this landing.

The worst RNZAF crash in New Zealand history occurred at Wigram on 15 October 1953, killing seven men. Two Royal New Zealand Air Force De Havilland Devons, the NZ1811 and NZ1810 from RNZAF Station Wigram, collided over Wigram Aerodrome. They had been part of the  last section of a 27 aircraft flypast over Harewood International Airport (as Christchurch airport was then called) marking the 1953 London to Christchurch Air Race Prize Giving Ceremony. When the formation broke up as the aircraft prepared to land back at Wigram, NZ1811 was struck on the wing by its “No. 2”, NZ1810. Sixty-five years after the fatal air collision, a plaque, inset into a boulder and featuring the names of the flight crew has been placed next to a memorial seat in a reserve at the end of Edwin Ebbett Place. All seven crew members are remembered by street names in the area such as Erling Ziesler Lane.

Wigram was home to RNZAF Wigram, one of the main bases of the Royal New Zealand Air Force, but this was closed in 1995 after cutbacks in military spending. The majority of Wigram Aerodrome was purchased by Ngāi Tahu in 1997, and continued to be used as a private airfield until it was finally closed on 1 March 2009. The RNZAF retained the original portion of the aerodrome which had been purchased by the Crown for the purpose of an Air Force base in 1923, an area which includes the Air Force Museum of New Zealand.

The 21st century has seen several subdivision developments being undertaken in Wigram.

Wigram Skies 
The remainder of the former airfield was subdivided by Ngāi Tahu Property into the Wigram Skies development following its closure. Street names in the new development reflect the area's aviation heritage, with names such as Corsair Drive, Kittyhawk Avenue and Skyhawk Road alongside The Runway – a road which follows the route of the former runway.

Broken Run (East) 
In 2005, this subdivision created six new roads and two new formed and sealed rights of way to provide access to 126 new residential allotments, and six new reserves totalling 2.8 hectares.

The subdivision has been named “Broken Run” by Brian Gillman Limited, as the land before development was a grazing farm with a natural valley and waterway splitting the farm into two halves, thus being a broken farm or run. The property is located at the headwaters of the Heathcote River.

The road names in Broken Run share a common theme of high country stations, e.g. Longspur Avenue (Longspur is a high country station near the Rakaia Gorge) and Highpeak Place (Highpeak Station is located at the head of the Selwyn River).

Broken Run (West) 
Surplus land from Christchurch's Southern Motorway extension was purchased in 2013 and subsequently developed by Gillman Wheelans in 2015. The Western part of Broken Run backs onto the original Broken Run subdivision separated by the Heathcote River.
The subdivision created sixty-one residential allotments, two allotments to vest in the Council as reserve, and a further four allotments vested as legal road.

The road names for this stage continued the theme from the original Broken Run subdivision of high country farms e.g. Four Peaks Drive (Four Peaks Station, near Fairlie in South Canterbury).

Geography
Wigram is north of Aidanfield, separated by the Christchurch Southern Motorway. Wigram also borders several other suburbs:

Middleton to the east, separated by Curletts Road.

Hornby to the west and northwest separated by Awatea Road (properties on Awatea road are not part of Wigram except a small number of properties on the east side of Awatea Road (numbers 65–135 inclusive), Springs Road and Main South Road (properties located on these roads are not part of Wigram)

Sockburn to the north separated by the Main South Line Railway

Hillmorton to the southeast separated by Curletts Road and the Heathcote River (Ōpāwaho)

Demographics
The recent development of the Wigram Aerodrome into housing has resulted in the suburb growing significantly in recent years. This has made Wigram one of the fastest-growing suburbs in post-earthquake Christchurch.

Wigram had a population of 8,226 at the 2018 New Zealand census, an increase of 4,950 people (151.1%) since the 2013 census, and an increase of 6,150 people (296.2%) since the 2006 census. There were 2,706 households. There were 4,092 males and 4,140 females, giving a sex ratio of 0.99 males per female, with 1,368 people (16.6%) aged under 15 years, 2,001 (24.3%) aged 15 to 29, 3,822 (46.5%) aged 30 to 64, and 1,035 (12.6%) aged 65 or older.

Ethnicities were 49.8% European/Pākehā, 5.7% Māori, 1.7% Pacific peoples, 45.8% Asian, and 2.9% other ethnicities (totals add to more than 100% since people could identify with multiple ethnicities).

The proportion of people born overseas was 46.7%, compared with 27.1% nationally.

Although some people objected to giving their religion, 49.4% had no religion, 37.2% were Christian, 2.5% were Hindu, 2.0% were Muslim, 2.3% were Buddhist and 2.3% had other religions.

Of those at least 15 years old, 2,127 (31.0%) people had a bachelor or higher degree, and 924 (13.5%) people had no formal qualifications. The employment status of those at least 15 was that 3,699 (53.9%) people were employed full-time, 879 (12.8%) were part-time, and 222 (3.2%) were unemployed.

Wigram is one of Christchurch's more affluent suburbs with residents earning, on average, over 10% more than the average Christchurch resident.

Over 45% of people living in Wigram identify as Asian whilst almost 50% identify as European. Wigram has a significantly lower percentage of people identifying as Maori or Pacific Islanders compared to Christchurch City as a whole.

People living in Wigram compared to Christchurch City are 10% more likely to be managers and 16% more likely to be professionals. They are also 32% less likely to be machinery operators and drivers and 27% less likely to be labourers.

Economy

Commercial
The Landing, located at the heart of Wigram Skies, provides a convenient and modern retail and mixed use space for Wigram Skies residents and greater south west Christchurch.
Stage one of The Landing, which was completed in mid-2015, has a 8975 sqm site area, including 2000 sqm of retail and office space spread across three buildings and a 2600 sqm New World supermarket.

Stage Two, which was completed in 2017 boasts a 3509sq m site area, including 1800sq m of retail, 600sq m of office space, and 451sq m of hospitality spread across three buildings.

The latest development, a new Cimena Complex with eight cinema screens, each seating 48 people, is set to Open in July 2021

Industrial
One of the hotspots in the Christchurch scene is Wigram Business Park, developed by Ngāi Tahu, with most of the properties sold to owner occupiers. It is located on Hayton Road on approximately 25 hectares of zoned Business 4 and has 52 lots. It adjoins Hayton Stream and multiple reserves which separate it from Wigram Skies.

The park is now home to a prestigious collection of occupiers and is very popular among businesses wanting to occupy modern, state-of-the-art premises on quality land to the west of Christchurch.

Wigram Business Park provides for businesses in Christchurch who were expanding but also offered a safe alternative for operators who were looking at relocating or re-establishing their businesses after earthquakes. One example is the purchase by NZX 50 listed Skellerup of a 3.4-hectare site in 2013 for $7.1 million which was subsequently developed into a $30 million, 18,900-square-metre purpose built manufacturing and office facilities to replace their quake-damaged Woolston site.

Another NZX 50 company to have modern premises in Wigram is Mainfreight with the development of their Hayton Road Logistics site completed in May 2015.

Transport

Road
Wigram is well-connected for road transport, with direct access via Parkhouse Road/Curletts Road to the State Highway Motorway network:
 State Highway 76 with access to the City Centre and Lyttelton.
 State Highway 73 with access to Upper Riccarton and Christchurch International Airport.
 State Highway 75 with access to Halswell and Akaroa.

Three Super-T bridges connect Wigram via local link roads with its neighbouring suburbs:
Wigram Magdala Link Bridge a three-span Super-T bridge which is 100 metres long passing over Curletts Road, opened on 29 July 2016 it connects Wigram with Middleton and provides another direct link to the central city.
Aidanfield Drive Bridge connecting Wigram to Aidanfield
Awatea Road Bridge connecting Wigram to Halswell

Public transport
Wigram is also well served by several bus services, known as Metro which is subsidised by Environment Canterbury.

The following routes pass directly through or on the border of Wigram:
Route 60 – Hillmorton/Southshore – Starting at The Landing via Corsair Drive and Skyhawk Road
Route 80 – Lincoln/Parklands – Passing Springs Road
Route 100 – Wigram/The Palms – via The Runway and Corsair Drive
Route 125 – Redwood/Westlake – Passing Awatea Road

Landmarks and features

National institutions 
The Air Force Museum of New Zealand, formerly called The Royal New Zealand Air Force Museum, is the national museum for the Royal New Zealand Air Force (RNZAF) and New Zealand military aviation, and stands on the site of the former air base. Also located on the Crown-owned, New Zealand Defence Force site is the Archives New Zealand Repository on Harvard Ave which was officially opened on 9 October 2018.

Parks, sports and recreation
Wigram has two large recreational parks adjoining each other, Ngā Puna Wai was opened on 8 March 2019 and comprises  of recreation, esplanade reserve and other park land as well as a new $53.65 million multi-sports facility whilst future plans include a new $20 million indoor sports centre.

There are also several smaller local neighbourhood parks, the largest of these is Te Kāhu Park bound by The Runway, Curtis Street, Dalwood Drive and Porter Street, boasting a children’s playground, three sports pitches within walking distance of all residences and is the home ground for the Halswell Wigram Rugby Club.

Other parks include:
Parera Park on Kittyhawk Avenue, featuring a natural playground.
Kahuku Park between The Runway and Limbrick Crescent, featuring a rock climbing sculpture.
Marama Park on the corner of Skyhawk Road and Kittyhawk Avenue, featuring a basketball court.
Harvard Park on Corsair Drive
Tautoru Park on Kittyhawk Avenue, featuring a tennis court as well as playground.
Raukura Park bound by The Runway, Keene Street and Corsair Drive
Mackinder Reserve bound by Skyhawk Road, Mackinder Drive, Valiant Street and Wigram Road.
Motorway Park Playground on Highpeak Place featuring a tennis court as well as playground.
Bendrose Reserve on Bendrose Crescent, which includes Broken Run Playground
West Broken Run Reserve on Wigram Road, which has the upper limits of the Ōpawaho Heathcote River running through it

Elderly housing and care
Wigram has two modern retirement villages, the first to open was Lady Wigram Village which opened in 2015 and is located on Kittyhawk Avenue. Opening soon after in 2016 was Summerset at Wigram located on Awatea Road on the South West edge of Wigram.

Education
 Wigram Primary School – Te Piki Kāhu relocated to The Runway, Wigram, from Sockburn in January 2019, teaching children from years 1 to 6. It has a roll of  students as of  The school opened as Sockburn School in 1955.

Governance

Community board
Wigram is represented in the Waipuna/Halswell-Hornby-Riccarton Community Board by two Halswell Ward Community Board members, Andrei Moore and Debbie Mora.

Council ward
Wigram is part of the Halswell Ward represented by Councillor Anne Galloway since 2016.

National electorate
The Suburb of Wigram sits in the aptly named New Zealand parliamentary electorate of Wigram.

The local MP representing the Wigram Electorate since 2011 is Dr Megan Woods.

References

Suburbs of Christchurch